Andrej Modić (born 7 March 1996) is a Bosnian professional footballer who plays as a midfielder.

Club career
Modić is a product of the Milan youth academy, where he was described by CEO Adriano Galliani as "one of the most talented players of his generation". He was signed by Vicenza on one-year loan on 5 August 2015. Modić made his Serie B and professional debut on 26 September 2015, against Pescara. On 15 July 2016, he moved on loan to Brescia. On 31 August 2017, he was loaned out to Rende.

On 26 January 2018, he signed a three and a half year contract with Bosnian Premier League club Željezničar. On 25 June 2018, Modić left Željezničar after making only one league appearance. On 31 August 2018, he signed with Krupa. He left Krupa in the winter transfer window of the 2019–20 season. He joined Serie D side Afragolese in August 2020 but was released in the winter en was snapped up by Giulianova in February 2021.

International career
Modić represented both the Bosnia and Herzegovina U19 and U21 national teams.

Career statistics

Club

Honours
Željezničar
Bosnian Cup: 2017–18

References

External links
Andrej Modić at Sofascore

1996 births
Living people
Sportspeople from Banja Luka
Serbs of Bosnia and Herzegovina
Association football midfielders
Bosnia and Herzegovina footballers
Bosnia and Herzegovina youth international footballers
Bosnia and Herzegovina under-21 international footballers
L.R. Vicenza players
Brescia Calcio players
Rende Calcio 1968 players
FK Željezničar Sarajevo players
FK Krupa players
Serie B players
Serie C players
Premier League of Bosnia and Herzegovina players
First League of the Republika Srpska players
Serie D players
Bosnia and Herzegovina expatriate footballers
Expatriate footballers in Italy
Bosnia and Herzegovina expatriate sportspeople in Italy